Ali Hemmatabad-e Tahmasabi (also Romanized as ʿAlī Hemmatābād-e Ţahmāsabī; also known as ʿAlīhemmatābād) is a village in Manj Rural District, Manj District, Lordegan County, Chaharmahal and Bakhtiari Province, Iran. At the 2006 census, its population was 79, in 12 families.

References 

Populated places in Lordegan County